Gary Coulibaly (born 30 March 1986) is a French former professional footballer who played as a midfielder. He was born in Corsica in France and is of Malian descent. He previously represented France at under-20 level, but has represented Corsica at senior level.

Career
Born in Bastia, Coulibaly began his career with SC Bastia and made 35 league appearances in four seasons with the club, one of them being in Ligue 1. He moved to Istres in July 2008 and helped the club gain promotion to Ligue 2 as National champions in his first season. Two years later, Coulibaly was transferred to Monaco, having scored 6 goals in 107 games for Istres.

In January 2014, he was released by Monaco, having played no games for the club in almost a year. A few days later, he signed a six months contract with Laval.

Six months later, Coulibaly returned to his native island, joining Ligue 2 side AC Ajaccio.

In July 2015, he joined Belgian First Division A club Waasland-Beveren on a free transfer. He signed a one-year contract with the option of another.

In August 2017, Coulibaly returned to his former club SC Bastia as one of four new signings announced by the club, which had played in Ligue 1 in the 2016–17 season but dropped to the fifth-tier Championnat National 3 after filing bankruptcy.

References

External links
 
 
 

1986 births
Living people
Sportspeople from Bastia
French footballers
French sportspeople of Malian descent
Association football midfielders
France youth international footballers
Corsica international footballers
SC Bastia players
FC Istres players
AS Monaco FC players
Stade Lavallois players
AC Ajaccio players
S.K. Beveren players
Levadiakos F.C. players
Ligue 1 players
Ligue 2 players
Championnat National players
Championnat National 2 players
Championnat National 3 players
Belgian Pro League players
Super League Greece players
French expatriate footballers
French expatriate sportspeople in Belgium
Expatriate footballers in Belgium
French expatriate sportspeople in Greece
Expatriate footballers in Greece
Footballers from Corsica